The south magnetic pole, also known as the magnetic south pole, is the point on Earth's Southern Hemisphere where the geomagnetic field lines are directed perpendicular to the nominal surface. The Geomagnetic South Pole, a related point, is the south pole of an ideal dipole model of the Earth's magnetic field that most closely fits the Earth's actual magnetic field.

For historical reasons, the "end" of a freely hanging magnet that points (roughly) north is itself called the "north pole" of the magnet, and the other end, pointing south, is called the magnet's "south pole". Because opposite poles attract, Earth's south magnetic pole is physically actually a magnetic north pole (see also ).

The south magnetic pole is constantly shifting due to changes in Earth's magnetic field.
That point lies outside the Antarctic Circle. The nearest permanent science station is Dumont d'Urville Station. While the north magnetic pole began wandering very quickly in the mid 1990s, the movement of the south magnetic pole did not show a matching change of speed.

Expeditions
Early unsuccessful attempts to reach the magnetic south pole included those of French explorer Dumont d'Urville (1837–40), American Charles Wilkes (expedition of 1838–42) and Briton James Clark Ross (expedition of 1839 to 1843).

The first calculation of the magnetic inclination to locate the magnetic South Pole was made on 23 January 1838 by the hydrographer , a member of the Dumont d'Urville expedition in Antarctica and Oceania on the corvettes L'Astrolabe and Zélée in 1837–1840, which discovered Adelie Land.

On 16 January 1909 three men (Douglas Mawson, Edgeworth David, and Alistair Mackay) from Sir Ernest Shackleton's Nimrod Expedition claimed to have found the south magnetic pole, which was at that time located on land. They planted a flagpole at the spot and claimed it for the British Empire. The three men began the expedition to the south magnetic pole in a motor car specially adapted for the cold conditions, but abandoned it when it proved useless on soft surfaces. They then walked a total of 1260 miles to reach the south magnetic pole while pulling sledges and supplies that weighed approximately 670 lbs. Walking on foot across the coldest place on earth was perilous, and the men faced many dangers such as falling in concealed snow crevasses and acquiring frostbite and snow-blindness. Fearing starvation, they strictly rationed their biscuits down to the crumbs, and hunted seals and penguins. However, there is now some doubt as to whether their location was correct.

Fits to global data sets

The south magnetic pole has also been estimated by fits to global sets of data such as the World Magnetic Model (WMM) and the International Geomagnetic Reference Model (IGRF). For earlier years back to about 1600, the model GUFM1 is used, based on a compilation of data from ship logs.

South geomagnetic pole

Earth's geomagnetic field can be approximated by a tilted dipole (like a bar magnet) placed at the center of Earth. The south geomagnetic pole is the point where the axis of this best-fitting tilted dipole intersects Earth's surface in the southern hemisphere. Because the field is not an exact dipole, the south geomagnetic pole does not coincide with the south magnetic pole. Furthermore, the south geomagnetic pole is wandering for the same reason its northern geomagnetic counterpart wanders.

See also 
 North Magnetic Pole
 Polar alignment

References

External links 
 Australian Antarctic Division

Polar regions of the Earth
East Antarctica
Geography of Antarctica
Geomagnetism
Orientation (geometry)